Dorados de Sinaloa, or Dorados, is a Mexican professional football club based on Culiacán, Sinaloa, Mexico.

History 
Dorados de Sinaloa was founded on August 9, 2003. The Dorados was the youngest team to play on First Division de México, having joined the division for the first time for the Apertura 2004 tournament when the club was only one year old. The Dorados currently play in the Liga de Expansión MX, the second tier of the Mexican league.

First promotion and relegation 
On 20 December 2003, the Dorados won their first title in the Apertura 2003 tournament of Primera División A. Guadalupe Castaneda scored the goal, beating the Cobras of Ciudad Juárez. They finished as runners-up in the Apertura 2004, and won the play-off promotion beating Club León with a goal from Roberto Dominguez and winning the promotion to Liga MX just one year after the club was founded. The club was relegated to the Apertura in a 2006 tournament after playing for just two years in the top tier.

Return to first Division 

On July 27, 2015, the Dorados played their first game in the First Division after 8 seasons in the Second Division. The game was celebrated in the Banorte Stadium versus Jaguares de Chiapas, with a 0–0 final score. Their first 3 points came in the second game of the season on July 31, against Xoloitzcuintles de Tijuana in the Caliente Stadium. Dayro Moreno scored for the North Californian team, but Mauricio Martín Romero scored the first goal of Dorados in the 2015–16 Liga MX season. The Dorados played and won their first game in the first division in 9 years, 1–2. The previous game being on April 22, 2006, when the Dorados beat Jaguares de Chiapas 4–2, with goals from Andrés Orozco, Cristian Patiño, and Pepe Guardiola.

Second relegation 
On April 16, 2016, after losing 5–2 to Tigres UANL, the Dorados were demoted after just one season in Liga MX, finishing last in the relegation table of 2015–16 Liga MX season marking the second time the club was relegated to Ascenso MX.

Rivalry with Club León
When the Dorados de Sinaloa arrived at Primera División A in 2003, a rivalry was born. When the franchise was first created in 2003, Dorados became champions in their first tournament, becoming the first team to ever accomplish this feat in Primera A. In their second tournament, Dorados made it to the final once again, falling to Club León. Despite losing this final, Dorados and León played the promotion game to Primera División de México where Dorados were victorious. Dorados and Leon have played a total of four finals, with each team winning two.

Since the relegation of Dorados to the Ascenso MX, the two sides have not played in a league match.

Honours
 Ascenso MX: 4
Apertura 2003, Clausura 2007, Clausura 2015, Apertura 2016

 Campeón de Ascenso: 2
2004, 2015

 Copa MX: 1
Apertura 2012

International Copa Ricardo: 
Second Place

Personnel

Management

Coaching staff

Players

First-team squad

Reserve teams

Dorados de Sinaloa (Liga TDP)
Reserve team that plays in the Liga TDP, the fourth level of the Mexican league system.

Notable players

 Carlos Casartelli
 César Gradito
 Diego Latorre
 Pablo Gabriel Torres
 Milton Caraglio
 Gaspar Servio
 Gabriel Hachen
 Flavio Rogerio
 Iarley
 Lucas Silva
 David Henriquez
 Andrés Orozco
 Yimmi Chara
 Óscar Rojas
 Jefferson Montero
 Vinicio Angulo
 Segundo Castillo
 Walter Ayovi
 Miguel Becerra
 Everaldo Begines
 Jared Borgetti
 Omar Briceño
 Guadalupe Castañeda
 Jorge Iván Estrada
 Hugo García
 Carlos Alberto Hurtado
 Héctor López
 David Mendoza
 Aurelio Molina
 Luis Padilla
 Mario Padilla
 Christian Patiño
 Carlos Pinto
 Aldo Polo
 Sergio Quiróz
 Lorenzo Ramírez
 Jaime Ruiz
 Diego Mejia
 Alfredo Frausto
 Mario Osuna
 Javier Güemez
 Joel Sánchez
 Cirilo Saucedo
 Christian Valdéz
 Cuauhtémoc Blanco
 Fernando Arce
 Elio Castro
 Raúl Enríquez
 Moisés Velasco
 Roberto Nurse
 Pep Guardiola
 Joe Corona
 Sebastián Abreu
 Héctor Giménez
 Nelson Maz
 Jonathan Lacerda
 Sonny Guadarrama

Coaches 

  Juan Carlos Chávez (2003–2004)
  Alexandre Guimarães (2004)
  José Luis Real (2004–2005)
  Carlos Bracamontes (2005)
  Juanma Lillo (2005–2006)
  Jose Luis Saldivar (2006)
  Jacques Passy (2006)
  Hugo Fernández (2006–2008)
  Jorge Almiron (2008–2009)
  Ricardo Rayas (2009–2011)
  Francisco Palacios (Interim) (2011)
  Robert Dante Siboldi (2012)
  Francisco Ramirez (2012–2014)
  Diego Torres (2014)
  Eduardo Fentanes (Interim) (2014)
  Carlos Bustos (2015)
  Omar Briceño (Interim) (2015)
  Luis Fernando Suarez (2015–2016)
  José Guadalupe Cruz (2016)
  Gabriel Caballero (2016–2017)
  Diego Ramirez (2017–2018)
  Francisco Ramírez (2018)
  Diego Maradona (2018–2019)
  José Guadalupe Cruz (2019)
  David Patiño (2020)
  Rafael García (2021–)

References

External links
 

 
Football clubs in Sinaloa
Ascenso MX teams
Liga MX teams